Rodam (died 1730) was a Georgian royal princess (batonishvili) of the Bagrationi dynasty of House of Mukhrani branch.

Princess Rodam was a daughter of King George XI of Kartli and Princess Khoreshan Mikeladze (died 1695).

Princess Rodam married King George VII of Imereti and had 5 children:
Tuta
Unknown daughter
Unknown daughter
Alexander V of Imereti (c. 1703/4-1752, r. 1720-1752)
Mamuka of Imereti

References

Year of birth unknown
1730 deaths
Princesses from Georgia (country)
House of Mukhrani
18th-century people from Georgia (country)
18th-century women from Georgia (country)
Queens consort of Imereti